The 2013–14 Dutch Basketball League season was the 54th season of the Dutch Basketball League, the highest professional basketball league in the Netherlands. The defending champion is Zorg en Zekerheid Leiden. GasTerra Flames from Groningen won their 4th title by beating SPM Shoeters Den Bosch 4–3 in the Finals.

Teams
All teams from the 2012-13 season returned. The club EiffelTowers Den Bosch changed its name to SPM Shoeters Den Bosch after their new sponsor SPM Shoes & Boots and Stepco BSW became Maxxcom BSW. During the season Rotterdam Basketbal College changed its name in Challenge Sports Rotterdam after Challenge Sports became their new main sponsor.

Squads

Regular season

Standings

Positions by round

Results

Playoffs

All-Star Gala
See 2014 DBL All-Star Gala

Awards
Four new awards were handed out this season, in the Playoffs MVP, Sixth Man of the Year award and the All-Defense and All-Rookie Teams.
Most Valuable Player:  Arvin Slagter (GasTerra Flames)
Playoffs MVP:  Arvin Slagter (GasTerra Flames)
MVP Under 23:  Leon Williams (Landstede Basketbal)
Statistical Player of the Year:  Darius Theus (Aris Leeuwarden)
Coach of the Year:  Ivica Skelin (GasTerra Flames)
Rookie of the Year:  Joshua Duinker (Zorg en Zekerheid Leiden)
Most Improved Player:  Jeroen van der List (Den Helder Kings)
Defensive Player of the Year:  Jason Dourisseau (GasTerra Flames)
Sixth Man of the Year:  Ali Farokhmanesh (SPM Shoeters Den Bosch)

All-Star Team:
 Cashmere Wright (GasTerra Flames)
 Arvin Slagter (GasTerra Flames)
 Patrick Richard (Matrixx Magixx)
 Joshua Duinker (Zorg en Zekerheid Leiden)
 Tai Wesley (SPM Shoeters Den Bosch)

All-Defense Team:
 Darius Theus (Aris Leeuwarden)
 Arvin Slagter (GasTerra Flames)
 Jason Dourisseau (GasTerra Flames)
 Stefan Wessels (SPM Shoeters Den Bosch)
 Ross Bekkering (GasTerra Flames)

All-Rookie Team
 Yannick Franke (Challenge Sports Rotterdam)
 Tom Snikkers (Aris Leeuwarden)
 Roman Grigoryev (Maxxcom BSW)
 Joshua Duinker (Zorg en Zekerheid Leiden)
 Lucas Steijn (BC Apollo)

Statistical leaders
Only players who played more than 29 games qualified. For the two point percentage ranking, a player had to take at least 5 shots per game, for the three point and free throw ranking 3 shots per game.

In European competitions

Notes

References

 
Dutch Basketball League seasons
1
Netherlands